This article is an alphabetic list of odonates (dragonflies and damselflies) species found in Metropolitan France, including Corsica.

 Gomphus flavipes, the river clubtail
 Gomphus graslinii
 Gomphus pulchellus, the Western clubtail
 Gomphus vulgatissimus, the common clubtail
 Lestes barbarus, the Southern emerald damselfly
 Lestes dryas, the emerald spreadwing
 Lestes macrostigma, the dark emerald damselfly 
 Lestes sponsa, the emerald damselfly
 Lestes virens, the small emerald damselfly
 Leucorrhinia albifrons, the dark whiteface
 Leucorrhinia caudalis, the lilypad whiteface
 Libellula depressa, the broad-bodied chaser
 Macromia splendens
 Onychogomphus forcipatus, the small pincertail
 Onychogomphus uncatus, the large pincertail
 Ophiogomphus cecilia
 Orthetrum cancellatum, the black-tailed skimmer
 Platycnemis acutipennis, the orange featherleg
 Trithemis annulata, the violet dropwing

References 

France
Odonata species